Aleksandre Metreveli (born 10 August 1993), nicknamed Sandro, is a Georgian tennis player. Metreveli has a career high ATP singles ranking of World No. 264 achieved on 6 June 2016. His career high ATP doubles ranking of World No. 184 was achieved on 25 July 2015. He has won 7 ITF singles titles and 4 ITF doubles titles.

Personal life
He is the grandson of the famous tennis player Alexander Metreveli, former ATP No. 9 and 1973 Wimbledon finalist.

In 2016, Metreveli broke both of his legs in a car accident, eventually recovering after five surgeries.

Career
Playing for Georgia in Davis Cup, Metreveli has a W/L record of 18–10.

ATP Challengers and ITF Futures finals

Singles: 10 (7–3)

Doubles: 13 (4–9)

References

External links

1993 births
Living people
Male tennis players from Georgia (country)
Sportspeople from Tbilisi